Nemertesia is a genus of cnidarians belonging to the family Plumulariidae.

The genus has cosmopolitan distribution.

Species:

Nemertesia alternata 
Nemertesia americana 
Nemertesia anonyma 
Nemertesia antennina 
Nemertesia belini 
Nemertesia caboverdensis 
Nemertesia californica 
Nemertesia ciliata 
Nemertesia compacta 
Nemertesia constricta 
Nemertesia cymodocea 
Nemertesia dissimilis 
Nemertesia distans 
Nemertesia elongata 
Nemertesia falcicula 
Nemertesia fraseri 
Nemertesia freiwaldi 
Nemertesia geniculata 
Nemertesia gracilis 
Nemertesia hancocki 
Nemertesia hexasticha 
Nemertesia hippuris 
Nemertesia inconstans 
Nemertesia indivisa 
Nemertesia intermedia 
Nemertesia inverta 
Nemertesia japonica 
Nemertesia longicorna 
Nemertesia mexicana 
Nemertesia multiramosa 
Nemertesia mutabilis 
Nemertesia nigra 
Nemertesia norvegica 
Nemertesia pacifica 
Nemertesia paradoxa 
Nemertesia parva 
Nemertesia perrieri 
Nemertesia pinnatifida 
Nemertesia polynema 
Nemertesia ramosa 
Nemertesia rugosa 
Nemertesia septata 
Nemertesia simplex 
Nemertesia singularis 
Nemertesia sinuosa 
Nemertesia tetraseriata 
Nemertesia tetrasticha 
Nemertesia triseriata 
Nemertesia tropica 
Nemertesia ventriculiformis 
Nemertesia verticillata 
Nemertesia vervoorti

References

Plumulariidae